The squash at the 2010 Commonwealth Games was held at the Siri Fort Sports Complex, New Delhi. Singles play took place from 4 October.

Top seed Nicol David won the gold medal, defeating 2nd seed Jenny Duncalf 11–3, 11–5, 11–7 in 40 minutes. Nicol won all her 5 matches in three straight games en route to the gold.

Medalists

Seeds

  Nicol David (champion)
  Jenny Duncalf (final)
  Alison Waters  (semifinals)
  Madeline Perry (quarterfinals)
  Laura Massaro (quarterfinals)
  Kasey Brown (semifinals)
  Jaclyn Hawkes (quarterfinals)
  Donna Urquhart (third round)
  Low Wee Wern (third round)
  Sarah Kippax (third round)
  Delia Arnold (third round)
  Joelle King (quarterfinals)
  Lisa Camilleri (third round)
  Dipika Pallikal (withdrew due to fever, replaced by Surbhi Misra)
  Joshna Chinappa (third round)
  Alana Miller (third round)

Draws and results

Finals

Top Half

Section 1

Section 2

Bottom Half

Section 1

Section 2

References

External links

Squash at the 2010 Commonwealth Games
Common